Minden is a census-designated place (CDP) in Douglas County, Nevada, United States. The population was 3,001 at the 2010 census. It is the county seat of Douglas County and is adjacent to the town of Gardnerville.  The Douglas campus of the Western Nevada College is located in Minden.

History
It was founded in 1906 by Heinrich Friedrich Dangberg Jr., who named it after the town of Minden, in the German state of North Rhine-Westphalia, which was near his father's birthplace. A large share of the first settlers were Germans. Minden was founded on company land of the Dangberg Home Ranch and Dangberg commissioned most of the town's  early buildings.  Minden has had a post office since 1906.

Use of sundown siren and sundown town status 
Minden sounds a "sundown siren" at 6pm almost every evening since 1917, originally signifying that members of the Washoe Indian tribe were required to leave town by 6:30pm or face jail or fine. Douglas County fully repealed its sundown ordinance in the mid-1970s. A Minden ordinance meant to clarify the siren's intent went on the books in 2007, but Minden continues to sound a siren every evening. 

In June 2021, the State of Nevada  passed a law that prohibits communities from sounding signals associated with a past law "which required persons of a particular race, ethnicity, ancestry, national origin or color to leave the town by a certain time." Minden Town Manager J. D. Frisbee claimed the law doesn't apply to them stating, “There’s a (Minden) ordinance in place right now that says that the siren sounds every day in commemoration of our first responders. … It never went off at 6:30, when the county had an ordinance to get Native Americans out of town.”

Geography

The Carson Valley and Minden are considered one of the top gliding spots in the world. Flights of over  have been made on sailplanes from this location. Its location, east of the Sierra Nevada range, favors lee wave formation. East of the Pine Nuts mountains is the Nevada desert, one of the best thermal generators in the world.

U.S. Highway 395 runs through Minden. It is also the terminus of State Route 88, which becomes California State Route 88 on the west side of the state line.

Climate
Minden has a cool semi-arid climate (Köppen BSk) with huge diurnal temperature variations during all seasons. Rainfall is very rare during the summer as the monsoon practically never reaches this far north: in July more than four years in ten record no measurable precipitation and only one in twenty expects . Winter afternoons are cool and frequently sunny, but mornings are freezing to frigid. The coldest afternoon was on January 9, 1937 when the temperature did not top  and the hottest minimum  on August 28 and 29, 1906, June 25, 1927 and August 20, 1931.

The majority of precipitation occurs from winter Pacific storm systems, although the Sierra Nevada rain shadow limits the precipitation they produce in Nevada. With at least , January 1909 was the wettest single month on record.

Demographics

As of the census of 2000, there were 2,836 people, 1,166 households, and 839 families residing in the CDP. The racial makeup of the CDP was 94.0% White, 0.1% African American, 0.7% Native American, 1.1% Asian, 0.1% Pacific Islander, 2.1% from other races, and 1.9% from two or more races. Hispanic or Latino of any race were 6.6% of the population.

There were 1,166 households, out of which 28.1% had children under the age of 18 living with them, 62.4% were married couples living together, 7.7% had a female householder with no husband present, and 28.0% were non-families. 23.0% of all households were made up of individuals, and 11.5% had someone living alone who was 65 years of age or older. The average household size was 2.38 and the average family size was 2.78.

In the CDP the population was spread out, with 21.9% under the age of 18, 4.4% from 18 to 24, 22.7% from 25 to 44, 27.5% from 45 to 64, and 23.5% who were 65 years of age or older. The median age was 46 years. For every 100 females, there were 95.5 males. For every 100 females age 18 and over, there were 92.4 males.

The median income for a household in the CDP was $56,795, and the median income for a family was $64,375. Males had a median income of $40,833 versus $34,700 for females. The per capita income for the CDP was $30,405. About 3.7% of families and 5.4% of the population were below the poverty line, including 10.2% of those under age 18 and 1.5% of those age 65 or over.

Education
Minden has a public library, a branch of the Douglas County Public Library.

Media
 Carson Valley Times
 The Record-Courier

Notable people
 Donald E. Bently – businessman; long term resident of Mindenol in Minden
 Shaaron Claridge - voice actress credited with providing the police dispatch voice work for Adam-12, Dragnet and Columbo.
 Shawn Estes – baseball player; attended high school in Minden
 Nicholas Furlong – songwriter and producer
 Howard D. McKibben – Federal Judge; practiced law in Minden from 1967 to 1971.
 David Derek Stacton – author; born in Minden
 Eric Whitacre – composer; attended high school in Minden

See also

 List of census-designated places in Nevada

References

External links

 

Census-designated places in Douglas County, Nevada
County seats in Nevada
German-American culture in Nevada
1906 establishments in Nevada
Sundown towns in Nevada